Grand Performances (GP) is Southern California's largest presenter of free performing arts programs and a landmark nonprofit arts institution established with a primary focus of bringing together diverse audiences within the City of Los Angeles. Concerts are held during the summer from June through September with at least one performance per weekend, usually more. Established in 1986, Grand Performances is in the Financial District of Downtown Los Angeles in Two California Plaza.  

Performances range from local artists to world musicians.

National and international awards
 2001 Special Achievement Award,Festival & Special EventsInternational Downtown Association
 2000 William Dawson Award,Programmatic ExcellenceAssociation of Performing Arts Presenters

Local and regional awards
 2002 Best Concerts AwardLos Angeles Downtown News
 2000 Rose Award NominationThe Downtown Breakfast Club
 2000 Lester Horton Dance Award,Outstanding ProductionThe Dance Resource Center of Greater Los Angeles
 1999 Best Concerts Award,Dance Award,Outstanding ProductionThe Los Angeles Downtown News

External links
http://www.grandperformances.org
http://www.seetheglobe.com/modules/news/article.php?storyid=964
https://web.archive.org/web/20070822012146/http://www.experiencela.com/newsletter/Newsletter06292006.htm

Arts organizations based in California
Performing arts centers in California
Non-profit organizations based in Los Angeles
Arts organizations established in 1986
1986 establishments in California